Frankenstein is an unincorporated community in northwestern Osage County, Missouri, United States. Frankenstein is located on Missouri Route C, about midway between Luystown to the east and Bonnots Mill to the west. Cedar Creek flows past, about one mile south of the site.

A post office called Frankenstein was established in 1893, and remained in operation until 1921. The community most likely derives its name from Godfried Franken (another source says Gottfried Franken), a pioneer citizen said to have donated land to the town in 1890.  The donated tract became known as Franken Hill; and, since "Stein" can mean "rock," the town name may have been a fancy way of honoring Mr. Franken for his donated stein (hill).

References

Unincorporated communities in Osage County, Missouri
Jefferson City metropolitan area
Unincorporated communities in Missouri